Terriss is a surname. Notable people with the surname include: 

Ellaline Terriss (1871–1971), English actress and singer
Tom Terriss (1872–1964), British actor, screenwriter, and film director
William Terriss (1847–1897), English actor